Dystrophia myotonica WD repeat-containing protein is a protein that in humans is encoded by the DMWD gene.

References

Further reading